Ola is an Arabic feminine given name that means "surmount", "high", and "arise".
It is also a common shorthand name in Norway and Sweden (as a variant of Olaf), and in Polish it is a diminutive form of feminine given names Olga and Aleksandra.

Moreover, Ọlá in West African Yoruba language is a popular unisex name, and is a root morpheme for other popular Yorùbá given names and surnames like Olamide, Olayemi, Olayinka etc.

Men
Ola (born 1987), English comedian
Ola Adeyemo (born 1995), Nigerian footballer
Ola Afolabi (born 1980), British boxer, former cruiserweight champion
Ola Aina (born 1996), English footballer
Ola Englund (born 1981), Swedish guitarist for Feared, The Haunted and formerly of Six Feet Under (band)
Ola Gjeilo (born 1978), Norwegian composer and pianist
Ola Håkansson (born 1945), Swedish singer, composer and producer
Ola Hanson (1864–1927), Swedish-American missionary in Burma
Ola Isene (1898–1973), Norwegian singer and actor
Ola John (born 1992), Liberian-Dutch footballer
Ola Kamara (born 1989), Nigerian footballer in Major League Soccer
Ola Kimrin (born 1972), former National Football League placekicker
Ola L. Mize (1931–2014), United States Army officer awarded the Medal of Honor
Ola Möller (born 1983), Swedish politician
Ola Otnes (born 1951), Norwegian actor
Ola Rapace (born 1971), Swedish actor
Ola Rotimi (1938–2000), Nigerian playwright and theatre director
Ola Salo (born 1977), Swedish singer
Ola Svensson (born 1986), Swedish singer, better known by his mononym Ola
Ola Toivonen (born 1986), Swedish footballer
Ola Ullsten (1931–2018), Swedish politician and diplomat, former Prime Minister of Sweden
Ola Wong (born 1977), Swedish author, journalist and sinologist
OLF Magnier (born 1965) name was derived from Odd as in Odd Little Fella, Shakespearean actor

Women
Ola Al-Fares (born 1985), Jordanian lawyer, journalist and television presenter
Ola Jordan (born 1982), Polish dancer
Ola Babcock Miller (1871–1937), American politician
Ola Orekunrin, British-Nigerian medical doctor and managing director of the charity Flying Doctors Nigeria
Ola Ray (born 1960), American model and actress
Ola Belle Reed (1916-2002), American folk singer
Ola Uduku, British African architect

Folk figures
Ola Värmlänning, a drunken prankster in Swedish-American folklore

See also
Ole (name)
Ola (surname)
Ola (disambiguation)

References

Unisex given names
Norwegian masculine given names
Swedish masculine given names
Lists of people by nickname